Gnathophis umbrellabius, the umbrella conger, is a conger of the family Congridae, found on soft bottoms of the continental shelf of the southwest Pacific Ocean. Length is up to 45 cm.

References

 
 Tony Ayling & Geoffrey Cox, Collins Guide to the Sea Fishes of New Zealand,  (William Collins Publishers Ltd, Auckland, New Zealand 1982) 

umbrellabius
Taxa named by Johann Jakob Kaup
Fish described in 1856